Alessandro Strozzi (died 28 August 1648) was a Roman Catholic prelate who served as Bishop of San Miniato (1632–1648) and Bishop of Andria (1626–1632).

Biography
On 4 May 1626, Alessandro Strozzi was appointed during the papacy of Pope Urban VIII as Bishop of Andria.
On 8 March 1632, he was appointed during the papacy of Pope Urban VIII as Bishop of San Miniato.
He served as Bishop of San Miniato until his death on 28 August 1648.

References

External links and additional sources
 (for Chronology of Bishops) 
 (for Chronology of Bishops)  
 (for Chronology of Bishops) 
 (for Chronology of Bishops)  

17th-century Italian Roman Catholic bishops
Bishops appointed by Pope Urban VIII
1648 deaths

Year of birth missing